Cadmium iodide is the inorganic compound with the formula CdI2.  It is a white hygroscopic solid.  It also can be obtained as a mono- and tetrahydrate. It has few applications. It is notable for its crystal structure, which is typical for compounds of the form MX2 with strong polarization effects.

Preparation
Cadmium iodide is prepared by the addition of cadmium metal, or its oxide, hydroxide or carbonate to hydroiodic acid. Also, the compound can be made by heating cadmium with iodine.

Crystal structure

In cadmium iodide the iodide anions form a hexagonal close packed arrangement while the cadmium cations fill all of the octahedral sites in alternate layers. The resultant structure consists of a layered lattice. This same basic structure is found in many other salts and minerals. Cadmium iodide is mostly ionically bonded but with partial covalent character.

Cadmium iodide's crystal structure is the prototype on which the crystal structures many other compounds can be considered to be based. Compounds with any of the following characteristics tend to adopt the CdI2 structure:

 Iodides of moderately polarising cations; bromides and chlorides of strongly polarising cations
 Hydroxides of dications, i.e. compounds with the general formula M(OH)2
 Sulfides, selenides and tellurides (chalcogenides) of tetracations, i.e. compounds with the general formula MX2, where X = S, Se, Te

References

Cadmium compounds
Iodides
Metal halides
Photographic chemicals
Crystal structure types